JETGO Australia was a regional airline and air charter company based at Eagle Farm, Queensland near Brisbane Airport.

The airline operated scheduled domestic passenger services in the Eastern states of Australia, which were suspended when the airline was placed under voluntary administration on 1 June 2018. It also offered charter services, particularly fly-in fly-out (FIFO) operations in support of the mining and resources sectors.

JETGO operated a fleet of Embraer Regional Jets, with a capacity of between 36 and 50 passengers.

Overview 
The company took delivery of its first 37-seat Embraer 135 aircraft in March 2012. and was granted an air operator's certificate (AOC) by the Civil Aviation Safety Authority (CASA) in May that year. As of July 2012, JETGO Australia was operating FIFO and charter services throughout Australia. Despite having a business model initially focused on charter operations, following approval by CASA in October 2014, JETGO announced it would begin establishing regular public transport services.

JETGO announced two original routes from Sydney to Roma and Tamworth, both scheduled to commence in November 2014. After delaying the start of Sydney-Roma route however, the airline announced that the services would not proceed. In February 2015, JETGO also announced that it would suspend its Sydney-Gladstone service, citing poor patronage.

Shortly after announcing its inaugural routes, JETGO announced that it would operate services between Brisbane and Tamworth, with up to 10 flights per week. The launch of the route was timed to coincide with the annual country music festival in January 2015.

On 1 June 2018, the airline was placed under voluntary administration, and all scheduled passenger operations were suspended. Jonathan McLeod and Bill Karageozis from McLeod Partners were appointed as the airline's administrators. The Supreme Court of New South Wales ruled that JETGO to be liquidated, following the creditors report by the administrators that showed JETGO owed  million to creditors and may have been trading while insolvent since 30 June 2016.

Destinations
During the period of operation JETGO flew to the following destinations:

New South Wales
Albury (Albury Airport)
Dubbo (Dubbo City Regional Airport) 
Port Macquarie (Port Macquarie Airport)
Sydney (Sydney Airport)
Tamworth (Tamworth Airport)
Wagga Wagga (Wagga Wagga Airport)
Wollongong (Illawarra Regional Airport)
Queensland
Barcaldine (Barcaldine Airport, charter)
Brisbane (Brisbane Airport)
Gladstone (Gladstone Airport)
Gold Coast (Gold Coast Airport)
Hervey Bay (Hervey Bay Airport)
Middlemount (Middlemount Airport, charter)
Osborne Mine (charter)
Rockhampton (Rockhampton Airport)
Townsville (Townsville Airport) 
Victoria
Melbourne (Avalon Airport)
Melbourne (Essendon Airport)

Fleet 

As of 1 June 2018, the JETGO fleet consisted of the following aircraft:

See also
List of defunct airlines of Australia
 Aviation in Australia

References

External links

Defunct airlines of Australia
Airlines established in 2011
2011 establishments in Australia
Airlines disestablished in 2018
Australian companies established in 2011
Australian companies disestablished in 2018